José Aníbal Díaz Collazo (born February 16, 1971) is a Puerto Rican politician affiliated with the Popular Democratic Party (PPD). He was elected to replace Carlos Vargas Ferrer in the Puerto Rico House of Representatives in 2015 after Vargas' death. Díaz represents District 29.

Biography 

Díaz Collazo grew up in the Jajóme Bajo sector of Cayey. His father is Aníbal Díaz Ofray. Díaz has an associate degree in electrical engineering.

In the 90s, Díaz started working as a housing inspector for the city of Cayey. After that, he worked as Director of Public Works for Cayey.

On October 15, 2015, Díaz announced his intention to represent District 29 (which includes Cidra and Cayey) in the House of Representatives at the upcoming general elections. In his speech, he emphasized his service to his hometown of Cayey for the past 20 years.

After the death of representative Carlos Vargas Ferrer, Díaz was selected to replace him in the Puerto Rico House of Representatives by the delegates of the Popular Democratic Party. His selection was unanimous, and was later ratified by the Governing Board of the Party. Díaz was sworn on November 16, 2015.

Personal life 

Díaz Collazo is married to Migdalia Santiago. He has two children: Aleysha and José Aníbal Díaz.

References 

1971 births
People from Caguas, Puerto Rico
Popular Democratic Party members of the House of Representatives of Puerto Rico
Living people